
As of January 2023, Air India serves a total of 39 international and 46 domestic destinations. Its network spans across various destinations in Asia, North America, Africa, Europe and Oceania. This list does not contain destinations served by subsidiary Air India Express.

Map

List

See also
 Air India Express destinations
 Alliance Air destinations
 List of Vistara destinations
 List of SpiceJet destinations
 List of Go First destinations
 List of IndiGo destinations

Notes

References

Lists of airline destinations
Destinations
Star Alliance destinations